Alexey Vladimir F. Ch. Bobrov (cyrillic: Алексей Владимирович Ф. Ч. Бобров) (born 1969) is a Russian botanist and explorer. He is a researcher at the Faculty of Geography of the Moscow State University.

References

20th-century Russian botanists
Russian explorers
1969 births
Living people
21st-century Russian botanists